Briosco is a comune (municipality) in the Province of Monza and Brianza in the Italian region Lombardy, located about  north of Milan.

Under the comune, lie two fraction: Capriano and the historical and cultural site of Fornaci. Briosco borders the following municipalities: Inverigo, Veduggio con Colzano, Renate, Besana in Brianza, Giussano, Carate Brianza, Verano Brianza.

Demographic evolution

References

External links
 www.comune.briosco.mb.it/

Populated places on Brianza